NGC 7320 is a spiral galaxy in Stephan's Quintet. However, it is not an actual member of the galaxy group, but a much closer line-of-sight galaxy at a distance of about 40 million light years, the same as the nearby NGC 7331. Other galaxies of Stephan's Quintet are some 300 million light-years distant. 

NGC 7320 has extensive H II regions, identified as red blobs, where active star formation is occurring.

The galaxy was imaged by the James Webb Space Telescope as part of Stephan's Quintet; the picture was released on 12 July 2022.

References

External links

https://webbtelescope.org/contents/news-releases/2022/news-2022-034

7320
NGC 7320
319
Unbarred spiral galaxies
Pegasus (constellation)